Meramec Heights is a locally designated name located on the intersection of Highway 21 and East/West Rock Creek. Meramec Heights does not have its own post office. All residents residing on the east side of 21 have an Arnold, Missouri address, and all residents residing on the west side of 21 have an Imperial, Missouri address.

References

Unincorporated communities in Jefferson County, Missouri
Unincorporated communities in Missouri